KZRM (96.1 FM) was a radio station broadcasting a country music and Northern New Mexico music music format. Licensed to Chama, New Mexico, United States. The station was owned by Chama Broadcasting Corp.

KZRM went on the air October 8, 1999. The station went silent on April 29, 2016; its license was cancelled on September 28, 2017.

References

External links

ZRM
Radio stations established in 1999
1999 establishments in New Mexico
Radio stations disestablished in 2017
2017 disestablishments in New Mexico
Defunct radio stations in the United States
ZRM